Jimmy Veikoso is a Tongan former professional rugby league footballer who represented Tonga at the 1995 World Cup.

Playing career
Veikoso played for the Canberra Raiders in 1993 and 1994. He represented Tonga at the 1992 Pacific Cup and the 1995 World Cup.

In 1996 and 1997 Veikoso played for the Leigh Centurions. He then joined the Swinton Lions.

Later years
Veikoso later took up rugby union, playing for the Sydney Harlequins in the New South Wales Suburban Rugby Union.

Veikoso took up bodybuilding and entered national competitions in 2007.

References

Australian expatriate sportspeople in England
Australian bodybuilders
Canberra Raiders players
Expatriate rugby union players in Australia
Leigh Leopards players
Living people
Rugby league wingers
Swinton Lions players
Tonga national rugby league team players
Tongan expatriate rugby union players
Tongan expatriate sportspeople in Australia
Tongan rugby league players
Tongan rugby union players
Year of birth missing (living people)